Commemorative stamps, postage stamps issued to honour or commemorate a place, event or person, have been released by the United Kingdom since 1924. Several sets were released during the decade of the 1990s.

History
Postage stamps were first used in Great Britain on 6 May 1840, with the introduction of the world's first adhesive postage stamp, the Penny Black. Up until 1924, all British stamps depicted only the portrait of the reigning monarch, with the exception of the 'High Value' stamps, the so-called "Sea Horses" design issued in 1913, which were twice the size of normal stamps with added pictorial design.

In 1924, the first 'Commemorative' stamp was issued for the British Empire Exhibition. There were then occasional issues over the next thirty years, when the frequency of new issues became more regular. From the mid-sixties, in most years, six to nine sets of commemorative stamps have been issued every year. PHQ Cards, postcard sized reproductions of commemorative stamps, have also been issued to accompany every new set of stamps since the mid-seventies.

Other decades
 United Kingdom commemorative stamps 1924–1969
 United Kingdom commemorative stamps 1970–1979
 United Kingdom commemorative stamps 1980–1989
 United Kingdom commemorative stamps 2000–2009
 United Kingdom commemorative stamps 2010–2019
 United Kingdom commemorative stamps 2020–2029

See also

 List of people on stamps
 Philately
 PHQ Cards
 Stamp Collecting

References and sources
Notes

Sources

Stanley Gibbons
Gibbons Stamp Monthly
Royal Mail Stamp Guide
Royal Mail British Philatelic Bulletin

External links
 Stanley Gibbons Stamps Shop Homepage
 Royal Mail

1990
Commemorative stamps
Lists of postage stamps
Commemorative
Commemorative stamps